The 1958 NBA draft was the 12th annual draft of the National Basketball Association (NBA). The draft was held on April 22, 1958, before the 1958–59 season. In this draft, eight NBA teams took turns selecting amateur U.S. college basketball players. In each round, the teams select in reverse order of their win–loss record in the previous season. The draft consisted of 17 rounds comprising 88 players selected.

Draft selections and draftee career notes
Elgin Baylor from Seattle University was selected first overall by the Minneapolis Lakers. Baylor went on to win the Rookie of the Year Award in his first season. Guy Rodgers from Temple University was selected before the draft as Philadelphia Warriors' territorial pick. Three players from this draft, Elgin Baylor, Guy Rodgers and Hal Greer, have been inducted to the Basketball Hall of Fame. Frank Howard from Ohio State University was selected in the third round by the Philadelphia Warriors, but he opted for a professional baseball career and eventually playing 16 successful seasons in the Major League Baseball (MLB).

Key

Draft

Other picks
The following list includes other draft picks who have appeared in at least one NBA game.

Notable undrafted players
These players were not selected in the 1958 draft but played at least one game in the NBA.

Trades
 Prior to the draft, the New York Knicks acquired the Detroit Pistons' first-round pick, which was used to select Mike Farmer, from the Pistons in exchange for Dick McGuire.

See also
 List of first overall NBA draft picks

References
General

Specific

External links
NBA.com
NBA.com: NBA Draft History

Draft
National Basketball Association draft
NBA draft
NBA draft
Basketball in New York City
Sporting events in New York City